Tim Gerard Johan Breukers (born 4 November 1987) is a Dutch former professional footballer who played as a right back.

Club career
Breukers joined FC Twente from Heracles in 2012, before he returned to his former club. After spending half a season on loan with Heracles Almelo, he made a permanent transfer in June 2015.

Career statistics

References

External links
 

1987 births
Living people
People from Oldenzaal
Dutch footballers
Quick '20 players
Heracles Almelo players
FC Twente players
Eredivisie players
Eerste Divisie players
Association football fullbacks
Footballers from Overijssel
Jong FC Twente players